Spodnja Senica (in older sources also Dolenja Senica) is a village on the left bank of the Sora River in the Municipality of Medvode in the Upper Carniola region of Slovenia.

References

External links

Spodnja Senica on Geopedia

Populated places in the Municipality of Medvode